Fall Creek is a river located in Tompkins County, New York. It flows into Cayuga Lake by Ithaca, New York.

Fall Creek makes its way through the campus of Cornell University in Ithaca, New York. Beebe Lake, Triphammer Falls, and Ithaca Falls are some of its notable features. It empties into Cayuga Lake at Stewart Park.

References

Rivers of Tompkins County, New York
Rivers of New York (state)
Rivers of Cayuga County, New York